List of all members of the Storting in the period 1969 to 1973.  The list includes all those initially elected to the Storting.

There were a total of 150 representatives, distributed among the parties: 74 to Norwegian Labour Party, 29 to Conservative Party of Norway, 20 to Centre Party (Norway), 14 to Christian Democratic Party of Norway and 13 to Venstre (Norway).

Venstre was split during the period, and as of December 9, 1972 there were 8 representatives for Det Nye Folkepartiet and therefore 5 representatives for Venstre (Norway).

Aust-Agder

Vest-Agder

Akershus

Bergen

Buskerud

Finnmark

Hedmark

Hordaland

Møre and Romsdal

Nordland

Oppland

Oslo

Rogaland

Sogn and Fjordane

Telemark

Troms

Nord-Trøndelag

Sør-Trøndelag

Vestfold

Østfold

 
Parliament of Norway, 1969–73